The Silver Bullet is a 1942 American Western film directed by Joseph H. Lewis and written by Elizabeth Beecher. The film stars Johnny Mack Brown, Fuzzy Knight, William Farnum, Jennifer Holt, LeRoy Mason and Rex Lease. The film was released on August 5, 1942, by Universal Pictures.

Plot

Cast        
Johnny Mack Brown as 'Silver Jim' Donovan
Fuzzy Knight as Wild Bill Jones
William Farnum as Dr. Thad Morgan
Jennifer Holt as Nancy Lee
LeRoy Mason as Walter Kincaid
Rex Lease as Rance Harris
Grace Lenard as Queenie Canfield
Claire Whitney as Emily Morgan
Slim Whitaker as Buck Dawson 
Michael Vallon as Nevada Norton
Merrill McCormick as Pete Sleen
Nora Lou Martin as Nora

References

External links
 

1942 films
1940s English-language films
American black-and-white films
American Western (genre) films
1942 Western (genre) films
Universal Pictures films
Films directed by Joseph H. Lewis
1940s American films